The Engine Alliance GP7000 is a turbofan jet engine manufactured by Engine Alliance, a joint venture between General Electric and Pratt & Whitney. It is one of the powerplant options available for the Airbus A380, along with the Rolls-Royce Trent 900.

Design and development

Originally intended to power Boeing Commercial Airplanes' cancelled 747-500X/-600X, the engine has since been pushed for Airbus' A380-800 superjumbo. It is built around an 0.72 scale of the GE90-110B/115B core  and contains a Pratt & Whitney fan and low-pressure system design.

The competing Rolls-Royce Trent 900 was named as the lead engine for the then-named A3XX in 1996 and was initially selected by almost all A380 customers. However, the GE/PW engine increased its share of the A380 engine market to the point where, as of September 2007, it will power 47% of the super-jumbo fleet. This disparity in sales was resolved in a single transaction, with Emirates' order of 55 GP7000-powered A380-800s, comprising over one quarter of A380 sales (as of September 2007). Emirates has traditionally been a Rolls-Royce customer. A380 aircraft powered by the GP7000s will have A380-86X model numbers as 6 is the code for Engine Alliance engines. The engine powers an estimated 60% of Airbus A380 in service as reported in 2017.

Ground testing of the engine began in April 2004 and was first flight tested as the number two engine on GE's 747 flying testbed over Victorville, CA in December 2004.
The American Federal Aviation Administration certified the engine for commercial operation on January 4, 2006.
The engine was ground run for the first time on an A380 on August 14, 2006, in Toulouse.
On August 25, 2006, the same aircraft, A380-861 test aircraft (MSN 009), made the first flight of an Engine Alliance powered A380. The flight began and ended at Toulouse and lasted about four hours. Tests were performed on the engines' flight envelope, cruise speed, and handling. A day earlier, the same aircraft performed rejected takeoff tests on the engines.

The Engine Alliance offered the GP7200 for the Airbus A380 passenger and freighter configurations. The engine is offered with two ratings appropriate for the various A380 configurations and take-off weights: GP7270 for the 560-tonne variant, and GP7277 for the 590 tonne A380-800 freighter (which was subsequently cancelled by Airbus).
The new components come from Volvo Aero.

MTU Aero Engines is a major partner of the programme, with 22.5% share. The German company produces the high-pressure turbine, the low-pressure turbine and the turbine center frame. Safran  with 17.5% designs and produces the low-pressure compressor. MDS Aero Support Corporation, a Canadian company, is working hand in hand with MTU to develop next-generation test beds.

MDS in joint cooperation is building the facility to test the next version of this engine in France.

Variants
In use by A380-861 of Air France, Etihad Airways, Korean Air, and Qatar Airways, as well as 90 of the 123 A380s ordered by Emirates.
Originally for use on the now-cancelled A380-863F freighter.

Applications
 Airbus A380

Notable incidents
On 30 September 2017, Air France Flight 66, an Airbus A380 with registration F-HPJE, suffered an uncontained engine failure during flight where the entire fan module (blades and disc) and nose cowl on its number-four GP7270 engine separated from the engine. The aircraft was flying from Paris Charles de Gaulle Airport to Los Angeles International Airport. The aircraft was safely diverted to CFB Goose Bay, Canada. To repatriate the stranded jet, the damaged engine would be replaced and sent back to GE's workshop at Cardiff; a replacement engine had to be placed in the same position to balance the weight for takeoff but not operable. The French accident investigation agency BEA, which is conducting the investigation into the incident, released photos of the first engine fan, fan hub and cowling parts being recovered in Greenland.

Specifications (GP7270)

See also

References

 FAA certificate data sheet

External links

 Official site, Engine Alliance
 Official site, GE-Aviation
 Official site, Pratt & Whitney

High-bypass turbofan engines
2000s turbofan engines